Leptomyrmex unicolor is a species of ant in the genus Leptomyrmex. Described by Carlo Emery in 1895, the species is endemic to Australia.

References

Dolichoderinae
Hymenoptera of Australia
Insects described in 1895